Loud, Fast Ramones: Their Toughest Hits is a compilation of Ramones songs. Curated by Johnny Ramone, the initial 50,000 copies of the album include the 8-song bonus disc Ramones Smash You: Live ’85. The bonus disc features previously unreleased live recordings made on February 25, 1985 at the Lyceum Theatre in London. It is notable for being the only officially released live recording on CD to feature Richie Ramone on drums.

Track listing
All songs were written by the Ramones except where indicated.

Disc one
 "Blitzkrieg Bop" – 2:11  (Ramones)
 "Beat on the Brat" – 2:31  (Joey Ramone)
 "Judy Is a Punk" – 1:31   (Joey R.)
 "Gimme Gimme Shock Treatment" – 1:40
 "Commando" – 1:51
 "Glad to See You Go" – 2:10   (Lyrics: Dee Dee R. / Music: Joey R.)
 "Pinhead" – 2:42   (Dee Dee R.)
 "Rockaway Beach" – 2:06   (Dee Dee R.)
 "We're a Happy Family" – 2:39
 "Sheena Is a Punk Rocker" – 2:48   (Joey R.)  /1
 "Teenage Lobotomy" – 2:01
 "I Wanna Be Sedated" – 2:29   (Joey R.)
 "I'm Against It" – 2:06
 "I Wanted Everything" – 3:13   (Dee Dee R.)
 "I Just Want to Have Something to Do" – 2:41   (Joey R.)
 "Rock 'n' Roll High School" – 2:17   (Joey R.)
 "Do You Remember Rock 'n' Roll Radio?" – 3:49   (Joey R.)
 "The KKK Took My Baby Away" – 2:29   (Joey R.)
 "Psycho Therapy" – 2:35  (Dee Dee Ramone / Johnny Ramone)  /2
 "Outsider" – 2:09   (Dee Dee R.)
 "Highest Trails Above" – 2:09   (Dee Dee R.)
 "Wart Hog" – 1:54   (Dee Dee R. / Johnny R.)  /3
 "Mama's Boy" – 2:10   (Dee Dee R. / Johnny R. / Tommy R.)
 "Somebody Put Something in My Drink" – 3:19  (Richie Ramone)
 "I Wanna Live" – 2:36   (Dee Dee R. / Daniel Rey)
 "Garden of Serenity" – 2:26   (Dee Dee R. / D. Rey)
 "I Believe in Miracles" – 3:18   (Dee Dee R. / D. Rey)
 "Main Man" – 3:26   (Dee Dee R. / D. Rey)  /4
 "Strength to Endure" – 2:59   (Dee Dee R. / D. Rey)  /4
 "The Crusher" – 2:26   (Dee Dee R. / D. Rey)  /4

 Original ABC distributed single version.
 Sire single version.

Bonus Disc
All live recorded at the Lyceum Theatre in London, on February 25, 1985.

 "Do You Remember Rock 'n' Roll Radio?" – 3:16  (Joey Ramone)
 "Psycho Therapy" – 2:04  (Dee Dee Ramone / Johnny Ramone)
 "Suzy Is a Headbanger" – 1:37
 "Too Tough to Die" – 2:09   (Dee Dee R.)
 "Smash You" – 2:17   (Richie Ramone)
 "Chinese Rock" – 1:59  (Dee Dee R. / Richard Hell)
 "Howling at the Moon (Sha–La–La)" – 2:57   (Dee Dee R.)
 "I Don't Wanna Go Down to the Basement" – 1:50   (Dee Dee R. / Johnny R.)

Personnel

Ramones
Joey Ramone - lead vocals
Johnny Ramone – guitar
Dee Dee Ramone - bass, backing vocals, lead vocals on "Wart Hog", bridge lead vocals on "Outsider"
C. J. Ramone – bass, backing vocals, lead vocals on "Main Man", "Strength to Endure", "The Crusher"
Marky Ramone - drums
Richie Ramone - drums, backing vocals
Tommy Ramone - drums

Additional musicians
Barry Goldberg – organ, piano
Dick Emerson – keyboards
David Hassel – percussion
Steve Douglas – saxophone
Graham Gouldman - backing vocals
Russell Mael - backing vocals
Ian Wilson - backing vocals
Rodney Bingenheimer - handclaps
Harvey Robert Kubernik - handclaps
Phast Phreddie - handclaps

Production
Bob Gruen – Artwork, Photography
Hugh Brown – Art Direction
Tony Bongiovi, Graham Gouldman, Jean Beauvoir, Craig Leon, Glen Kolotkin, Phil Spector, Ritchie Cordell, Daniel Rey, Bill Laswell, The Ramones – Producer
B.J. Papas, Jill Furmanovsky, Michael Ochs, Robert Matheu, Clemens Rikken, Danny Fields – Photography
Brian Kehew – Mixing
David Fricke – Liner Notes
Johnny Ramone – Compilation
Sean Donahue – DJ
Dan Hersch – Remastering
Steven P. Gorman – Photo Research
Randy Perry, Leigh Hall – Project Assistant
Mick McKenna – Engineer
Bryan Lasley – Art Direction, Design
Sheryl Farber – Editing, Editorial Supervision
Marc Salata – Product Manager
Steve Woolard – Discographical Annotation, Liner Notes
George DuBose – Photography, Cover Design, Detail Analysis, Jacket Design, Inlay Design
Ed Stasium – Producer, Engineer
Tommy Ramone – Producer, Associate Producer, Engineer
Bill Inglot – Compilation Producer, Remastering, Mixing
Gary Stewart – Compilation Producer

References

2002 greatest hits albums
Albums produced by Phil Spector
Albums produced by Tony Bongiovi
Albums produced by Graham Gouldman
Albums produced by Ed Stasium
Ramones compilation albums
Ramones live albums
Rhino Entertainment live albums
Rhino Entertainment compilation albums
2002 live albums
Albums produced by Glen Kolotkin
Sire Records compilation albums
Sire Records live albums